Max Handelman (born May 3, 1973) is an American sportswriter, producer, and blogger. He co-wrote the book Why Fantasy Football Matters: (And Our Lives Do Not) with Erik Barmack. Handelman is married to actress Elizabeth Banks. Handelman co-founded the production company Brownstone Productions, whose first film, Surrogates, was released in 2009.

Early life
Handelman was born and raised in Portland, Oregon, in a Jewish family. Handelman attended Catlin Gabel School, graduating in 1991. He received his bachelor's degree from the University of Pennsylvania in 1995, where he was a member of the Alpha Epsilon Pi fraternity, and received an MBA degree from UCLA in 2003.

Career and works
Handelman co-founded the production company Brownstone Productions alongside wife Elizabeth Banks. Their first film, Surrogates, was released in 2009. The company is best known for the Pitch Perfect films.

Handelman is a fan of fantasy football. He wrote Why Fantasy Football Matters: (And Our Lives Do Not), with his friend Erik Barmack. They also collaborated on a weblog covering the Portland Trail Blazers entitled Beyond Bowie.

Personal life
Handelman is married to actress Elizabeth Banks, his college girlfriend, whom he wed in 2003. The couple live in Los Angeles. He and his wife had their first child, a boy named Felix, via surrogacy in March 2011.
On November 14, 2012, they had a second boy, Magnus Mitchell Handelman, again via gestational surrogacy. He is a fan of the Portland Trail Blazers.

Filmography
 Surrogates (2009)
 Pitch Perfect (2012)
 Resident Advisors (Web series)
 Pitch Perfect 2 (2015)
 The Most Hated Woman in America (2016)
 The Trustee (2017) (TV movie)
 Pitch Perfect 3 (2017)
 Charlie's Angels (2019)
 Cocaine Bear (2023)

See also
List of sports writers
List of people from Portland, Oregon

References

External links
 

1973 births
American bloggers
American investment bankers
20th-century American Jews
American sportswriters
Living people
UCLA Anderson School of Management alumni
University of Pennsylvania alumni
Writers from Portland, Oregon
Catlin Gabel School alumni
21st-century American non-fiction writers
Film producers from Oregon
21st-century American Jews